The Pomodorino del Piennolo del Vesuvio or sometimes just Pomodorino Vesuviano, is a grape tomato grown in Naples, Italy, and has PDO protected status, which was granted in 2009.

The cultivation area is restricted to 18 comuni around Mount Vesuvius, pretty much all within the Vesuvius National Park.

References

Tomato cultivars
Italian products with protected designation of origin
Italian cuisine
Mount Vesuvius
Metropolitan City of Naples